John Brown (born 30 December 1947) is an English former goalkeeper, who played for Preston North End, Stockport County, Wigan Athletic and Macclesfield Town.

In 1976, he signed for Wigan Athletic when they were still in the Northern Premier League and made 69 league appearances for the club before they were voted into the Football League. Brown was Wigan's first ever goalkeeper in the Football League and was the club's Player of the Year in 1980. He made a further 93 league appearances for the club before joining Macclesfield Town in 1982.

References

External links
 

1947 births
Living people
English footballers
Association football goalkeepers
English Football League players
Preston North End F.C. players
Stockport County F.C. players
Wigan Athletic F.C. players
Macclesfield Town F.C. players
Footballers from Bradford